La Motte-Picquet, LaMotte-Picquet, laMotte-Picquet, la Motte-Picquet, Lamotte-Picquet, or variation, may refer to:

 Toussaint-Guillaume Picquet de la Motte (1720-1791, aka la Motte-Piquet), 18th-century admiral
 French ship La Motte-Picquet, a list of ships of the French Navy named after the admiral
 French frigate La Motte-Picquet (D 645), a French Navy F70 type anti-submarine frigate 
 French cruiser La Motte-Picquet, a French Navy Duguay-Trouin-class light cruiser launched in 1924
 La Motte-Picquet-class cruiser, a cancelled pre-WW1 French Navy cruiser class
 La Motte-Picquet – Grenelle, a subway station of the Paris Métro
 Avenue de la Motte-Picquet, the street that the subway station is named after

See also

 Picquet (disambiguation)
 Lamotte (disambiguation)
 Motte (disambiguation)
 
 
 
 Piquette (disambiguation)
 Piquet (disambiguation)
 Picket (disambiguation)
 Pickett (disambiguation)